WFML (96.7 FM) is a radio station licensed to Vincennes, Indiana, United States. The station airs a classic hits format and is owned by the Vincennes University Foundation.

Established as a privately-owned commercial station in 1965, it was donated to the university in 1986 so its owner could buy a higher-power FM station. While managed by the university, WFML operates on a commercial basis, unlike the other Vincennes University broadcast outlets.

History

Commercial years

On February 10, 1965, the Vincennes Sun Company, owner of WAOV (1450 AM), received a construction permit to build a new FM station in Vincennes, with the transmitter at its studio site in the American National Bank Building. The station signed on May 17, 1965, initially simulcasting the AM station as a test. It would not be until the fall of 1966 when WAOV-FM gained its own program format. By the early 1970s, WAOV-FM had become "Fun Music Radio"; in an era when most Top 40 formats were on AM and only a handful of pioneer FM hit music stations had emerged in major cities, the format provided contemporary music and was also syndicated to other stations by the station manager's son.

Adjacent to the tower for WAOV AM was the Vincennes Executive Inn, owned by Robert E. Green. Green sought to expand the inn, but he needed the station property to carry out his plan. Green bought WAOV-AM-FM in 1979; the radio stations moved into a penthouse studio in the Executive Inn, while the FM went through technical and programming changes. The call letters were changed to WRTB, and the transmitter was moved to a new tower shared with the AM station; the station was changed to live programming instead of using tapes.

Donation to VU
In 1986, Green acquired a pair of radio stations licensed to nearby Washington: WAMW (1580 AM) and WFML (106.5 FM), the third-oldest FM station in the state. The acquisition was made with the express purpose of obtaining the higher-power FM signal to relocate WRTB. Green could not retain both of the AM stations or both of the FM stations; he opted to donate the pair to the Vincennes University Foundation, which already owned noncommercial WVUB (91.1 FM). VU immediately sought a buyer for the Washington AM outlet.

VU's broadcasting program expanded with the ability to train students in the operation of a commercial radio station. However, the station was not profitable for the university. In 2002, the university opted to outsource the operations of WFML under a local marketing agreement. Media Five, a locally owned marketing agency, began programming the station with a country format, which continued in 2007 when DLC Media, led by Dave Crooks, successfully bid for the rights. DLC first shifted the station to classic country as "The Fox", DLC changed the station to variety hits under the name "Max". WFML later switched to classic rock, retaining the brand. In 2014, the "Max" classic rock format was replaced by a return to variety hits using the Jack FM moniker. This continued until VU opted to resume operating WFML itself in 2017, using a soft adult contemporary "smooth rock" format focused on songs from the 1960s, 1970s and early 1980s. By 2022, this format had evolved to classic hits.

References

External links
WFML's website

FML
1965 establishments in Indiana
Radio stations established in 1965
Vincennes, Indiana
Vincennes University
Classic hits radio stations in the United States